Pholidotomidae is an extinct taxonomic family of fossil predatory sea snails, marine gastropod mollusks in the superfamily Muricoidea.

References

Prehistoric gastropods